John Louis Taylor (March 1, 1769 – January 29, 1829) was an American jurist and first chief justice of the North Carolina Supreme Court.

Born in London, England, he is the only foreign-born Chief Justice in state history. He was brought to America at the age of 12 and attended the College of William & Mary.

Taylor was elected to represent Fayetteville, North Carolina in the North Carolina House of Commons in 1792, 1794 and 1795. He became a state Superior Court judge in 1798 and turned over most of his law practice to his brother-in-law, young William Gaston, who later became a North Carolina Supreme Court judge and U.S. Congressman.

Before 1818, several North Carolina Superior Court judges met en banc twice each year, to review appeals and disputes from their own trial courts.  This was eventually called the "Supreme Court."  Taylor sat as part of this Court often and in 1810 was chosen as its chief justice.  When the North Carolina General Assembly decided to create a full-time, distinct Supreme Court in 1818, the legislators chose three men to make up the new Court: Taylor, Leonard Henderson, and John Hall.  The three met and elected Taylor to once again assume his title of chief justice.  He served on the Court until his death, near Raleigh, in 1829. Taylor is buried in Historic Oakwood Cemetery.

Taylor was a prominent Freemason and served as Grand Senior Warden of North Carolina, while William R. Davie was Grand Master, and he himself served as Grand Master from 1802–1804 and from 1814-1816. He was a member of Phoenix Lodge No. 8, A.F. & A.M., Fayetteville, North Carolina.

Elmwood, his home at Raleigh, was listed on the National Register of Historic Places in 1975.

Works
His publications include:  
 The North Carolina Law Repository (two volumes, 1814–16)
 Term Reports (1818)
 On the Duties of Executors and Administrators (1825)

References

North Carolina Historical Marker
North Carolina Historical Marker for Taylor's home, Elmwood
North Carolina Manual
North Carolina History Project (About Gaston)
UNC Library (About Gaston)
Masonic History
North Carolina Reports, NC Supreme Court, 1919
NC Supreme Court Historical Society

American legal writers
Members of the North Carolina House of Representatives
1769 births
1829 deaths
Chief Justices of the North Carolina Supreme Court
College of William & Mary alumni
18th-century American politicians
18th-century American judges
19th-century American judges
Lawyers from London
English emigrants to the United States
People from Fayetteville, North Carolina
Burials at Historic Oakwood Cemetery